Christopher Ossai (born 1 April 1957) is a Nigerian boxer. He competed at the 1980 Summer Olympics in Moscow, and at the 1984 Summer Olympics in Los Angeles, both times in the lightweight class.

As a professional, he held the African lightweight title from 1991 to 1993 when he was stripped.

1980 Olympic results

Below is the record of Christopher Ossai, a Nigerian lightweight boxer who competed in the 1980 Moscow Olympics:

 Round of 16: lost to Richard Nowakowsi (East Germany) on points, 0-5

References

External links
 

1957 births
Living people
Light-welterweight boxers
Olympic boxers of Nigeria
Boxers at the 1980 Summer Olympics
Boxers at the 1984 Summer Olympics
Boxers at the 1982 Commonwealth Games
Commonwealth Games gold medallists for Nigeria
Nigerian male boxers
Commonwealth Games medallists in boxing
African Games bronze medalists for Nigeria
African Games medalists in boxing
Competitors at the 1978 All-Africa Games
African Boxing Union champions
Medallists at the 1982 Commonwealth Games